Toshie the Nihilist is a Japanese comedic short film written and directed by Matthew Chozick. It has won numerous awards after premiering at the Academy Award and BAFTA qualifying LA Shorts International Film Festival on July 14, 2021.

Plot
Cryptocurrency exchange secretary Toshie (Rino Higa) ought to be celebrating the release of her boyfriend (Taro Yabe) from jail. Instead, a freak accident compels her to swim from Japan to Hawaii with the child of an American-Vietcong war hero.

Cast
 Rino Higa as Toshie
 Taro Yabe as Boyfriend
 Hideo Furukawa as Boss
 Takato Yonemoto as Bad Influence 
 Nanami Hidaka as Crypto Twins
 Matthew Chozick as Anh Dung

Awards

Select screenings 
 25th LA Shorts International Film Festival
 76th Salerno International Film Festival
 28th Victoria Film Festival
 22nd Boston Underground Film Festival
 75th Edinburgh Festival Fringe (in Nightpiece)
 15th Sydney Underground Film Festival
 75th Cannes Film Festival Short Film Corner
 13th Burbank International Film Festival
 28th Golden Boll Film Festival
 9th Chelsea Film Festival
 10th New York Shorts International Film Festival

References

External links
 
  Toshie the Nihilist on Twitter
 Toshie the Nihilist on Instagram

2021 films
2020s Japanese-language films
2021 short films
Japanese short films